"I Will Follow Him" is a popular song that was first recorded in 1961 by Franck Pourcel, as an instrumental titled "Chariot". The song achieved its widest success when it was recorded by American singer Little Peggy March with English lyrics in 1963. The music was written by Franck Pourcel (using the pseudonym J.W. Stole) and Paul Mauriat (using the pseudonym Del Roma). It was adapted by Arthur Altman. The completely new English lyrics were written by Norman Gimbel.

Instrumental versions
The song was first recorded by Franck Pourcel as an instrumental, and was released in 1961 on the European LP Amour, Danse, Et Violons. No.17 and on an EP on the La Voix de son Maître label. Pourcel co-wrote the song with his friend and fellow French bandleader Paul Mauriat. Mauriat later recorded an instrumental version, which he released on his album Paul Mauriat Plays the Hits of 1976.

In 1963, Percy Faith released an instrumental version, re-titled "I Will Follow You", as the lead song on side 1 of his album titled Themes for Young Lovers. The album spent 28 weeks on Billboards chart of Top LPs, reaching No. 32, and earned Percy Faith a gold record.

Petula Clark versions
In 1962, Petula Clark released a French-language version of the song, titled "Chariot" (lyrics by Jacques Plante), which reached No. 1 in Wallonia, No. 2 in France, and No. 8 in Flanders, and earned Clark a gold record. Her English version (the first recording to be titled "I Will Follow Him") reached No. 4 in Denmark, where it was released by Vogue, but failed to chart in the UK and the US, where it was released by Pye and Laurie respectively. Clark also recorded Italian and German versions of the song, with her Italian version, "Sul mio carro", reaching No. 4 in Italy, and her German version, "Cheerio", reaching No. 6 in West Germany.

Little Peggy March version
On January 22, 1963, Little Peggy March's version of "I Will Follow Him", backed with "Wind Up Doll", conducted by Sammy Lowe, in studio RCA Victor Studio A, New York City on January 7, 1963, after running take 9, was released by RCA Victor. March's version spent 14 weeks on the Billboard Hot 100, reaching No. 1 on April 27, 1963 and spending three weeks in this position, making 15-year-old March the youngest female artist to have a U.S. chart-topping single. Her version also reached No. 1 in Australia, Hong Kong, Israel, South Africa, Uruguay, Canada's CHUM Hit Parade, New Zealand's "Lever Hit Parade", and Billboards Hot R&B Singles chart.

The song also reached No. 1 on the Cash Box Top 100, in a tandem ranking of Little Peggy March, Franck Pourcel, Petula Clark, Rosemary Clooney, Betty Curtis, Jackie Kannon, Joe Sentieri, and Georgia Gibbs' versions, with March's version marked as a bestseller. It was one of the nominees for the 1964 Grammy Award for Best Rock and Roll Recording.

In 2011, Peggy March re-recorded "I Will Follow Him" with Dutch singer José Hoebee (who covered this song and reached the number-one spot in the Netherlands and Belgium in 1982). THowever, it took another year for the release of this new version song, which was eventually released on the German version of March's album Always And Forever.

Chart performance

Weekly charts

Year-end charts

Other versions
In Italy three versions of the song were in the charts in 1963 (translated/adapted by Vito Pallavicini and Bruno Pallesi): One recorded by Betty Curtis (highest position: No. 3), another version by Petula Clark ("Sul mio carro"; No. 4) and the Franck Pourcel version (No. 5). The song reached No. 1 in Italy's Musica e dischi, in a tandem ranking of these three versions. Curtis's version was also a top 10 hit in Uruguay.

In 1963, Italian singer Ennio Sangiusto released a version of the song titled "Chariot (La Tierra)", which reached No. 1 in Spain. Also in 1963, Italian singer Joe Sentieri released a version of the song titled "La Tierra", which reached No. 3 in Argentina.

In 1963, Argentine singer Alberto Cortez released a version of the song titled "La Tierra (Chariot)", which reached No. 2 in Spain. Also in 1963, Argentine singer Violeta Rivas released a version titled "La Tierra", which reached No. 1 in Uruguay.

Dee Dee Sharp released a version of the song on her 1963 album Do the Bird. Sharp's version reached No. 1 in Hong Kong.

Ricky Nelson recorded a cover for his 1963 album For Your Sweet Love, changing the title and lyrics to "I Will Follow You".

In 1982, Dutch singer José Hoebee (former member of the girl band Luv') released a hit cover of the song, which reached No. 1 in Flanders, No. 1 on the Dutch Top 40, and No. 2 on the Dutch Nationale Hitparade. A 2005 remix reached No. 90 on the Dutch Single Top 100 in early 2006. In 2011, she re-recorded "I Will Follow Him" with Peggy March. This duet appeared on the German edition of March's album Always and Forever.

The Norwegian comedian Lars Mjøen wrote comedic Norwegian lyrics, «Torsken kommer!» (translates to «The cod is coming»). The song was published by the comedy troupe KLM as Brødrene Dal as the B-side of "Gaus, Roms Og Brumund" (PolyGram 2052 206) and on the LP record Spektralplate (Polydor 2382 135) in 1982. A music video remake was released by Norges Bank in 2017 to mark the introduction of the new 200 krone banknote that features a cod on the obverse side.

The song is featured at the end of the 1992 film Sister Act, where it was performed by the nuns' chorus for the Pope with Whoopi Goldberg's character as the lead singer. The song peaked at number 53 on the Australian ARIA Singles Chart.

In 2000, Cynthia Patag, Nanette Inventor, Malou de Guzman, Beverly Salviejo and Pinky Marquez performed the interactive version of the song at the end of the musical episode of Wansapanataym, "Bata-Okey".

References

External links
 Official Peggy March, includes discography
 

1963 singles
Peggy March songs
Billboard Hot 100 number-one singles
Cashbox number-one singles
Number-one singles in Australia
Number-one singles in Canada
Number-one singles in Israel
Number-one singles in New Zealand
Number-one singles in South Africa

Number-one singles in Belgium

Number-one singles in Spain

Dutch Top 40 number-one singles
Song recordings produced by Hugo & Luigi
Songs with lyrics by Norman Gimbel
Songs with music by Arthur Altman
RCA Victor singles
Petula Clark songs
Percy Faith songs
Dee Dee Sharp songs
1961 songs